A court artist may refer to:
 A court painter (or sculptor) – an artist who painted for the members of a royal court
 An artist who makes courtroom sketches